Rosthern was a federal electoral district in Saskatchewan, Canada, that was represented in the House of Commons of Canada from 1935 to 1968.

This riding was created in 1933 from parts of Humboldt, Long Lake, Prince Albert and Saskatoon ridings.

It was abolished in 1966 when it was redistributed into Moose Jaw, Prince Albert, Regina—Lake Centre, Saskatoon—Biggar and Saskatoon—Humboldt ridings.

Election results

See also 

 List of Canadian federal electoral districts
 Past Canadian electoral districts

External links 

Former federal electoral districts of Saskatchewan